Messier 38 or M38, also known as NGC 1912 or Starfish Cluster, is an open cluster of stars in the constellation of Auriga. It was discovered by Giovanni Batista Hodierna before 1654 and independently found by Le Gentil in 1749. The open clusters M36 and M37, also discovered by Hodierna, are often grouped together with M38. The open cluster NGC 1907 lies nearby on the sky, but the two are most likely just experiencing a fly-by, having originated in different parts of the galaxy.

The cluster's brightest stars form a pattern resembling the Greek letter Pi or, according to Webb, an "oblique cross". Walter Scott Houston described its appearance as follows:
"Photographs usually show a departure from circularity, a feature quite evident to visual observers.  Older reports almost always mention a cross shape, which seems more pronounced with small instruments.  A view with a 24-inch reflector on a fine Arizona night showed the cluster as irregular, and the host of stars made fruitless any effort to find a geometrical figure."

At its distance of 1066 pc., its angular diameter of about 20 arc minutes corresponds to about 4.0 parsecs (13 light years), similar to that of its more distant neighbor M37. It is of intermediate age at about 290 million years. From the population of about 100 stars, this open cluster  features a prominent yellow giant with the apparent magnitude +7.9 and spectral type G0 as its brightest member. This corresponds to an absolute magnitude of -1.5, or a luminosity of 900 Suns. For comparison, the Sun would appear as a faint magnitude +15.3 star from the distance of M38.

Components

See also
 List of Messier objects
 Messier 36
 Messier 37

References

External links

 Messier 38, SEDS Messier pages
 
 

Open clusters
038
NGC objects
Auriga (constellation)
Perseus Arm
?